Micropilina arntzi is a species of monoplacophoran, a superficially limpet-like marine mollusc. It is found off the coast of Antarctica. It has three pairs of gills.

Anatomy
Micropilina arntzi has three pairs of gills, three pairs of nephridia ("kidneys"), six irregularly coiled intestinal loops, two pairs of oesophageal pouches, and no heart.

References

Monoplacophora
Molluscs described in 1992